Rugby league is a spectator sport in Tasmania, administered by the Tasmanian Rugby League. Prior to folding in 2015, the Tasmanian Rugby League Premiership was the highest tier of the sport in Tasmania. There are no rugby league competitions currently operating in Tasmania.

History 
In the 1950s a rugby league competition was created which continued operating until the early 1960s. In the 1990s, two unsuccessful attempts were made to establish a rugby league competition.

The Tasmanian Rugby League was founded at a meeting at Heathorn's Hotel, Hobart on 2 December 1953 and the first competition was held in 1954 with teams including Bellerive (Eastern suburbs), Taroona, Newtown and Canterbury. Players were initially recruited from Hobart Rugby Union teams and the first matches were played on 3 April 1954 at the South St Grounds, Bellerive. The first premiership was won by Taroona.

The first interstate match was played against Victoria on 12 June 1954 with Tasmania winning 18-8.

By the mid 1990s the Tasmanian Rugby League was running a statewide competition which included Six Hobart teams:

 Glenorchy Stingrays
 Panthers (possibly Sandy Bay Panthers)
 Eastern Suburbs Eagles
 Northern Suburbs Tigers (not connected to the current Hobart Tigers)
 Hobart City Falcons
 Derwent Valley Sharks

and three regional teams:

 Launceston Clippers (the Australian Maritime College)
 North-West Warriors (Based in Ulverstone)
 Smithton Bulls

The Tasmanian Rugby League also ran a Northern Tasmanian vs Southern Tasmanian competition during this period. Ben McKinnon from the Launceston Clippers is the only player to have won the statewide best + fairest on two occasions both in his debut season in 1995 and then again in 1997.

Due to dwindling player numbers the competition contracted to four Hobart teams during the early 2000s and midway through the 2003-04 season the senior amateur competition folded as a result of rising public liability insurance costs.

In late 2009 a new senior competition was established through the efforts of local 7HO FM Radio Personality Jason 'Wolfie' Wolfgram (President 09/10), and in conjunction with ARL Rugby League Development Officer, Graham McNaney. The decision to re-establish the competition followed a public forum at the Hotel Grand Chancellor in Hobart on Thursday 25 June 2009.

Governing body

NRL Tasmania (formerly and colloquially known as the Tasmanian Rugby League) is the governing body for rugby league in Tasmania.

The organisation is currently controlled by NRL Victoria as a cost-saving mechanism due to the low popularity of the sport in Tasmania. This has caused widespread controversy however, with many rugby league fans believing the code does not place any value in Tasmania.

No competitive activity has taken place since 2014.

Tasmanian Rugby League Premiership (2009-2015) 

The Tasmanian Rugby League Premiership was reborn in 2009. 
Over its course, the competition consisted of 7 teams at various times:
 Claremont Cowboys
 Hobart Tigers
 Launceston Warriors
 North West Coast Titans
 Northern Suburbs Broncos/Cowboys
 South Hobart Storm (Formally Eastern Shore Thunder)
 Southern Rabbitohs

Premierships 

The competition folded midway through the 2014-15 season, and there have been no attempts to re-form it since.

Representative Team 

Tasmanian Rugby League team is the representative team of the Tasmanian Rugby League. They have competed in many competitions since their first game in 1954, most notably in the Affiliated States Championship (sometimes combined with South Australia.

Popularity 
Australian Rules is traditionally the most popular football code in Tasmania, due to the state's close proximity to Victoria.

According to WIN Television, the 2014 NRL season generated an average television audience of 10 000 Tasmanians on Fridays and Sundays.

The two premier events in Australian rugby league, the NRL grand final and State of Origin, attract television audiences in excess of 40 000 Tasmanians.

Trial matches played in the state have attracted crowds of 11,727 and 6,000 respectively.

NRL Trial Matches 
NRL club Melbourne Storm have played two NRL trial matches in Hobart as Tasmania falls within their franchise area.

See also

Rugby league in Australia
Sport in Tasmania

References

External links
 
 

 
Tasmania